Boveresse was a municipality in the district of Val-de-Travers in the canton of Neuchâtel in Switzerland.  On 1 January 2009, the former municipalities of Boveresse, Buttes, Couvet, Fleurier, Les Bayards, Môtiers, Noiraigue, Saint-Sulpice and Travers merged to form Val-de-Travers.

References

External links
 

Former municipalities of the canton of Neuchâtel